Benkow is a surname. Notable people with the surname include:

Bjørn Benkow (1940–2010), Norwegian journalist 
Jo Benkow (1924–2013), Norwegian politician and writer

Norwegian-language surnames